Heyday was a Thoroughbred gelding that competed in the sport of eventing, ridden by American Bruce Davidson. He was one of the Top Ten All American High Point Horses of the Century in eventing. He stands .

Heyday was very successful at a young age, competing at the advanced level at the age 6. He went on to represent the United States at the Atlanta Olympics in 1996 earning the team silver medal, won the 1995 Pan American Games, came second at the Blenheim Horse Trials in 1997, and won team bronze at the World Championships in Rome. However, Heyday was notorious for his inconsistent show jumping rounds.

Heyday, bred and owned by Dr. Elinor Jenny,  was ridden by her granddaughter Maisy Grassie, who had great success in the Young Riders with him, taking him to her first Advanced Horse Trials.

Competition Results
2003
 8th Fair Hill International HT Advanced (Maisy Grassie)

2002
 7th North American Young Riders Championship CCI** (Maisy Grassie)
 4th Menfelt HT OI (Maisy Grassie)
 13th Plantation Field HT Advanced (Maisy Grassie)
 4th Morven Park HT OI (Maisy Grassie)
 
2001
 34th Radnor Hunt Int'l Three-day Event CCI** (Maisy Grassie)
 4th Middleburg H.T. OI (Maisy Grassie)
 2nd Fair Hill H.T. at Plantation Field OI (Maisy Grassie)
 5th Seneca Valley PC H.T. OI (Maisy Grassie)
 17th Fair Hill International H.T. at Fair Hill OI (Maisy Grassie)
 19th Morven Park H.T. OI (Maisy Grassie)

2000
 4th Middleburg H.T. OI (Maisy Grassie)
 1st North American Young Riders Championship CCI* (Maisy Grassie)
 5th Bromont Three-day Event CCI *** (Maisy Grassie)

1998
 Team Bronze, Individually 21st at the World Equestrian Games in Rome
 8th Rolex Kentucky Three Day
 15th Beaulieu North American Classic HT (Advanced)
 3rd Morven Park Spring HT (Advanced)
 13th Pine Top Spring H.T. (Advanced)
 8th Sharpton Winter H.T. AI

1997
 2nd Blenheim Horse Trials CCI ***
 9th Gatcomb Park
 20th Punchestown Three-Day Event CCI ***
 28th Beaulieu North American Classic H.T. (Advanced)
 9th Morven Park Spring HT (Advanced)
 
1996
 Team Silver, 9th Individually at the Atlanta Olympic Games
 2nd North Georgia International Open Invitational H.T. (Advanced)
 19th Groton House Farm H.T. II (Advanced)
 13th Beaulieu North American Classic H.T. (Advanced)
 11th Morven Park Spring H.T.(Advanced
 14th Sharpton Winter H.T. OI

1995
 16th Burghley Three Day Event CCI ****
 1st Pan American Games ***
 
1994
 4th Fair Hill International Three-Day Event CCI ***
 2nd Morven Park H.T. (Advanced)
 2nd Bromont Three Day Event HT OI
 7th Kentucky Three-Day Event CCI ***
 5th Beaulieu North American Classic H.T. (Advanced)

Eventing horses
Horses in the Olympics
1987 animal births